The Assembly of God Church of Samoa is a Pentecostal Independent Christian organization, founded in 1974, active in Samoa, Australia and New Zealand.

See also
 Samoan Assemblies of God in New Zealand Incorporated

References

External links
The organization's web site

Christian organizations established in 1974
Religious buildings and structures in Samoa
Churches in Samoa
Pentecostal denominations in Oceania